Seinäjoen JymyJussit (Finnish for "Jymy and Jussit from Seinäjoki", sometimes referred to as Seinäjoki) is a Finnish professional pesäpallo team based in Seinäjoki and playing in the top-tier Finnish Superpesis. Seinäjoen JymyJussit has participated in Superpesis since 2012. The club is owned by two traditional pesäpalloteams from Seinäjoki; Nurmon Jymy and Seinäjoen Maila-Jussit. The name "JymyJussit" is the combination of these two owner clubs.

Seinäjoen JymyJussit's home ground is the Seinäjoki ballpark; Kotijoukkue Areena. The seating capacity of the ballpark is 4,500. The ballpark locates at the city center of Seinäjoki.

References

Pesäpallo
Sports teams in Finland